The Volvo Viking was a truck produced by Swedish automaker Volvo between 1953 and 1973.

Volvo Viking 
Volvo introduced the L385 Viking in 1953. The truck had a payload capacity of up to 8 tonnes for the heaviest trailing axle versions. The Viking truck was very similar to the larger Titan model. For the first model years the Viking used the VDC motor from its predecessor L245, but it was soon replaced by the updated D67 engine.

1959 saw the introduction of the refined L485 Viking, including a stronger chassis. From 1961, the truck was available with a turbodiesel. In 1964 Volvo introduced the forward control L4851 Viking Tiptop with a tilting cab. This model only lasted a short time, being replaced by the F86 in the summer of 1965, similar in appearance but nearly all-new underneath the skin.

Volvo N86 

When Volvo introduced its "System 8" in 1965 the truck's name was changed to N86. Beneath the Viking cab Volvo conducted extensive changes including a new engine, a fully synchronized eight-speed gear box and a general updating of most components.

Engines

References

External links 

 Volvo Trucks Global - history
 Swedish brass cars - picture gallery

Viking
Vehicles introduced in 1953